Beef And Dairy Network Podcast is a monthly comedy podcast, which began in July 2015. It is produced by comedian Benjamin Partridge who plays the host of a fictional industry podcast for the beef and dairy industries.

In 2016, the podcast joined the Maximum Fun podcast network.

In 2017 and 2018, ten episodes were acquired for broadcast by BBC Radio 4, which was notable as the first time that the station had bought the repeat rights for an existing podcast.

Format

Podcast 
It describes itself as "the number one podcast for those involved, or just interested, in the production of beef animals and dairy herds" and consists of fictional interviews, spoof adverts, fictional letters from listeners, and documentary features. The show is a surrealist comedy played straight, and features a number of ongoing storylines, such as the search for (and government cover-up of) a "fifth meat" and the many ventures of disgraced slaughterhouse owner Eli Roberts.

Live Show 
There have been live show versions of the podcast, at Kings Place in London in 2017 and 2022 and in 2019 at London Southbank Centre.

Guests 
Partridge is joined by different guests each week, playing various characters from the beef and dairy industries. Guests have included Nick Offerman, Greg Davies, Josie Long, Andy Daly, Kevin Eldon, Mike Wozniak and Katy Wix.

Reception 
The Guardian named it one of the top 50 best podcasts of 2016, and also as one of the top 50 comedy podcasts of 2021. The Observer called it a "lovely, funny show." The Daily Telegraph wrote, "It's the ramrod straight delivery that makes The Beef and Dairy Network Podcast by far the best audio comedy around". The A.V. Club wrote "When dealing with the absurd, few things help heighten comedy quite like commitment, something that Beef And Dairy does better than most."

Gilly Smith called the podcast a "cult classic" in a book about starting podcasting.

The podcast won Best Comedy at the British Podcast Awards in 2017 and 2018.  the Beef and Dairy Network's unofficial Facebook group has 1.3 thousand members.

Episodes

References

External links 

2015 podcast debuts
Audio podcasts
Comedy and humor podcasts
Maximum Fun
British podcasts